The 2021 IIHF Women's World Championship Final was played on 31 August 2021, at WinSport Arena in Calgary, Canada. Canada defeated the United States 3–2 in overtime to win their 11th title and first since 2012, ending team USA's streak of five consecutive gold medals.

Background
Since the first IIHF Women's World Championship in 1990 and the first women's tournament at the Winter Olympics in 1998, the American and Canadian national teams have played in the finals on all occasions except for the 2006 Winter Olympics, when Sweden played Canada, and the 2019 IIHF Women's World Championship, where Finland played the United States.

Road to the final

Match

References

External links
Official website

Final
IIHF
IIHF
2012 in Alberta